The 1981 Houston Cougars football team represented the University of Houston during the 1981 NCAA Division I-A football season. The Cougars were led by 20th-year head coach Bill Yeoman and played their home games at the Astrodome in Houston, Texas. The team competed as members of the Southwest Conference, finishing in third. Houston was invited to the 1981 Sun Bowl in El Paso, Texas, where they lost to Oklahoma, 14–40.

Schedule

Source:

References

Houston
Houston Cougars football seasons
Houston Cougars football